"What Does It Take (To Win Your Love)" is a 1968 song that was a 1969 hit single by Jr. Walker & the All Stars.  The single was one of Jr. Walker's  most successful releases, becoming a hit on both the R&B and pop singles charts. "What Does It Take (To Win Your Love)," written by Johnny Bristol, Harvey Fuqua, and Vernon Bullock, made it into the top five on the Hot 100, and became Jr. Walker's second #1 on the R&B charts. The song was also a hit in the UK in 1969, reaching #13 on the UK Singles Chart. It remained in the chart for 12 weeks. The song was voted Top US Soul Record of 1969 and has sold over a million copies. Its extended intro and saxophone solo have influenced the works of David Sanborn, Clarence Clemons and Bobby Keys. It was nominated for the Grammy Award for Best R&B Instrumental Performance.
 
Alton Ellis also covered the song on his 1974 album Mr Soul of Jamaica. Many sources give the release date for this album as 1967. Others, such as AllMusic, question the year of release. The version released as a single is dated 1970. In 1986 instrumentalist Kenny G (with Ellis Hall on vocals) covered this tune on his 1986 album "Duotones". The song appears on 1982 album Shangó by Santana.

Personnel
Lead vocals and tenor sax solos by Junior Walker
Harmony vocals by Johnny Bristol
Backing vocals by The Andantes and The Originals
Other instrumentation by The All-Stars with members of The Funk Brothers and the Detroit Symphony Orchestra

Chart history

References

External links 
 List of cover versions of "What Does It Take (To Win Your Love)" at SecondHandSongs.com

1969 singles
1970 singles
Motown singles
Tamla Records singles
Songs written by Johnny Bristol
Songs written by Harvey Fuqua
Junior Walker songs
1968 songs